Afoa is a surname. People with this surname include:

 Bunty Afoa (born 1996), New Zealand professional rugby league footballer
 Evelina Afoa (born 1998), Samoan Olympic swimmer
 Fa'ausu Afoa (born 1967), Samoan rugby league footballer
 John Afoa (born 1983), New Zealand rugby union footballer
 Afoa Moega Lutu (born 1947), American Samoan politician and lawyer
 Nick Afoa (born 1986), New Zealand tenor and former rugby union footballer